Cat predation on wildlife is the result of the natural instincts and behavior of both feral and owned house cats to hunt small prey, including wildlife. Some people view this as a desirable phenomenon, such as in the case of barn cats and other cats kept for the intended purpose of pest control; but scientific evidence does not support the popular use of cats to control urban rat populations, and ecologists oppose their use for this purpose because of the disproportionate harm they do to beneficial native wildlife. As an invasive species and superpredator, they do considerable ecological damage.
	
Due to cats' natural hunting instinct, ability to adapt to different environments, and the wide range of small animals they prey upon, both feral and domesticated cats are responsible for predation on wildlife. Cats are invasive species, super-predators, and opportunistic hunters resulting in considerable ecological harm. The mere presence of cats in environments can create fear amongst native species through the ecology of fear, impacting populations of native species and limiting their survival. Cats are disease carriers and can spread diseases to animals in their community and marine life. There are methods to help mitigate the environmental impact imposed by feral cats through different forms of population management. Reducing cats' impact on the environment is limited by perceptions society has towards cats because humans have a relationship with cats as companions.

In Australia, hunting by cats helped to drive at least 20 native mammals to extinction, and continues to threaten at least 124 more. Their introduction has caused the extinction of at least 33 endemic species on islands throughout the world. A 2013 systematic review in Nature Communications of data from 17 studies found that feral and domestic cats kill billions of birds in the United States every year.

Birds

A 2013 study by Scott R. Loss and others of the Smithsonian Conservation Biology Institute and the U.S. Fish and Wildlife Service found that free-ranging domestic cats (mostly unowned) are the top human-caused threat to wildlife in the United States, killing an estimated 1.3 to 3.7 billion birds and 6.3 to 22.3 billion mammals annually. These figures were much higher than previous estimates for the U.S. Unspecified species of birds native to the U.S. and mammals including mice, shrews, voles, squirrels and rabbits were considered most likely to be preyed upon by cats.
Perhaps the first U.S. study that pointed to predation by cats on wildlife, as a concern was ornithologist Edward Howe Forbush's 1916 report for the Massachusetts State Board of Agriculture, The Domestic Cat: Bird Killer, Mouser and Destroyer of Wildlife: Means of Utilizing and Controlling It.

Island settings pose particular challenges for wildlife. A 2001 study identified cats alone as responsible for the plight of some island bird species, such as the Townsend's shearwater, socorro dove, and the Marquesan ground dove. The same study identified the greatest cause of endangerment of birds as habitat loss and degradation, with at least 52% of endangered birds affected, while introduced species on islands, such as domestic cats, rats and mustelids, affected only 6% of endangered birds. Other studies caution that removing domestic cats from islands can have unintended consequences, as increasing rat populations can put native bird and mammal species at risk.

Impact by location

Australia

Cats in Australia have been found to have European origins.  This is important to note because of their effect on native species. Feral cats in Australia have been linked to the decline and extinction of various native animals. They have been shown to cause a significant impact on ground nesting birds and small native mammals.

Feral cats have also hampered any attempts to re-introduce threatened species back into areas where they have become extinct as the cats have hunted and killed the newly released animals. Numerous Australian environmentalists claim the feral cat has been an ecological disaster in Australia, inhabiting most ecosystems except dense rainforest, and being implicated in the extinction of several marsupial and placental mammal species. Some inhabitants have begun eating cat meat to mitigate the harm that wild cats do to the local wildlife.

In 2020, it was reported that a culling of feral cats that had recently begun in Dryandra Woodland, in Western Australia, had caused the population of numbats to triple in number, the largest number of the endangered marsupial to have been recorded there since the 1990s.

Feral and pet cats in Australia are estimated to kill around 650 million lizards and snakes per year, or about 225 reptiles per cat on average. Cats were found to be actively hunting and killing over 250 different species of reptiles in Australia, with 11 of which being considered endangered species. Cats consume so many lizards in Australia that there was a single cat found with the parts of 40 individual lizards inside of its stomach, the highest amount recorded thus far.

Canada
A 2013 study estimated that between 100 and 350 million birds are killed annually by pet cats in Canada.

China
Domestic cats are common throughout China, and the number of pet cats in the country increased at a rate of 8.6% from 2018 to 2019. A 2021 estimate based on a public survey estimated that outdoor cats kill "1.61–4.95 billion invertebrates, 1.61–3.58 billion fishes, 1.13–3.82 billion amphibians, 1.48–4.31 billion reptiles, 2.69–5.52 billion birds, and 3.61–9.80 billion mammals" there each year. The authors recommended policies be implemented, such as a public education initiative to encourage people to keep their cats indoors, and building more animal shelters. They also recommended that TNR programs "should be limited until rigorous, peer-reviewed studies are able to show that such efforts consistently attain the sterilization rates needed to result in stabilization and permanent decline of unowned cat populations," as they said that most TNR programs fail to do this.

New Zealand

The fauna of New Zealand has evolved in isolation for millions of years without the presence of mammals (apart from a few bat species). Consequently, birds dominated the niches occupied by mammals and many became flightless. The introduction of mammals after settlement by Māori from about the 12th century had a huge effect on indigenous biodiversity. European explorers and settlers brought cats on their ships and the presence of feral cats was recorded from the latter decades of the 19th century.
It is estimated that feral cats have been responsible for the extinction of six endemic bird species and over 70 localised subspecies as well as depleting bird and lizard species.

South Africa 
In a 2020 study, approximately 300,000 domestic cats in Cape Town kill 27.5 million animals a year; this equates to a cat killing 90 animals per year. Cats on the urban edge of the city of Cape Town kill more than 200,000 animals in the Table Mountain National Park annually. Reptiles constituted 50% of killed prey, but only 17% of prey brought home; mammals constituted 24% of prey, but 54% of prey brought home. Non-native species accounted for only 6% of animals killed by cats from the urban edge, and 17% from deep urban cats.

United Kingdom
Sir David Attenborough in his Christmas Day, 2013, edition of BBC Radio 4 programme Tweet Of The Day said "cats kill an extraordinarily high number of birds in British gardens". Asked whether cat owners should buy bell collars for their pets at Christmas, he replied: "that would be good for the robins, yes". In the UK, the Royal Society for the Protection of Birds says there is no scientific evidence that predation by cats is having any effect on the population of birds UK-wide. Nick Forde, a trustee of the UK charity SongBird Survival, said the RSPB's claim of no evidence was disingenuous because adequate studies had not been done.

In the UK, it is common to allow pet cats access to the outdoors. SongBird Survival considers that "the prevailing line that 'there is no scientific evidence that predation by cats is having any impact on bird populations in UK' is simply no longer tenable", and that "no study has ever examined the impact of cats on songbirds at the population level; evidence shows that the recovering sparrowhawk population in the 1970-80s resulted in the decline of some songbird populations; cats kill around 3 times as many songbirds as sparrowhawks; the mere presence of cats near birds' nests was found to decrease provision of food by a third while the resultant mobbing clamour from parent birds led in turn to increased nest predation by crows and magpies; [and that] it is therefore far more likely that cats have an even greater impact on songbird populations than sparrowhawks".

United States 
The United States is estimated to house a population of 60-80 million feral cats, and they are estimated to kill 2.4 billion birds per year, making them the leading human-caused threat to the survival of bird species in the country.

In California, a study found that in areas where humans feed feral cats, they will continue to hunt large numbers of native birds even without the intention of eating them. This has resulted in the disappearance of native bird species, such as the California Quail (Callipepla california) and California Thrasher (Toxostoma redivivum), in those areas where they once resided.

In Maryland, a study showed that due to feral cats overhunting chipmunks, the natural prey of many raptor species, the Cooper’s Hawk (Accipiter cooperii) population struggled to find food and had to switch to preying on harder-to-catch songbirds, which lengthened their hunting times and increased their nestlings mortality rate.

Cats were presented to Hawaii due to sailing ships from Europe, whose purpose was to restrict both mice and rats on the ships. Cats are known to be able to hunt on their own. In Hawaii, they can feed on songbirds and many other birds that nest on the ground and in burrows. Cats, considered wide-range predators, can hunt in any habitat they are in, which causes a decrease in the population of these prey, especially in nestlings, which are vulnerable to being unable to fly. A study was made in endangered birds’ habitats with an infrared camera to predict how feral cats decreased the population of birds. They find up to 11% of Palila nests depredated yearly, which significantly impacts this species due to the few eggs laid every year and a slow development from nestling to adulthood.

In New York City, cats are commonly brought into businesses to combat the city's rat problem. Studies done in New York City determined that cats are not effective predators against rats and much more of a threat to other urban wildlife.

Islands

Consequences of introduction

Many islands host ecologically naive animal species. That is, animals that do not have predator responses for dealing with predators such as cats. Feral cats introduced to such islands have had a devastating impact on these islands' biodiversity.

They have been implicated in the extinction of several species and local extinctions, such as the hutias from the Caribbean, the Guadalupe storm petrel from the Pacific coast of Mexico, and Lyall's wren. In a statistical study, they were a significant cause for the extinction of 40% of the species studied. Moors and Atkinson wrote, in 1984, "no other alien predator has had such a universally damaging effect."

Feral cats, along with rabbits, some sea birds, and sheep, form the entire large animal population of the remote Kerguelen Islands in the southern Indian Ocean. Although exotic mammals form the bulk of their diet, cats' impact on seabirds is very important.

Restoration
Because of the damage cats cause in islands and some ecosystems, many conservationists working in the field of island restoration have worked to remove feral cats. (Island restoration involves the removal of introduced species and reintroducing native species.) , 48 islands have had their feral cat populations eradicated, including New Zealand's network of offshore island bird reserves and Australia's Macquarie Island.

Larger projects have also been undertaken, including their complete removal from Ascension Island. The cats, introduced in the 19th century, caused a collapse in populations of nesting seabirds. The project to remove them from the island began in 2002, and the island was cleared of cats by 2004. Since then, seven species of seabird that had not nested on the island for 100 years have returned.

In some cases, the removal of cats had unintended consequences. An example is Macquarie Island, where the removal of cats caused an explosion in the number of rabbits, that started feeding of the island's vegetation, thus leaving the birds without protection to other predators, like rats and other birds even if the eradication was positioned within an integrated pest management framework. The removal of the rats and rabbits was scheduled for 2007 and it could take up to seven years and cost $24 million.

Mice and rats

Cats are sometimes intentionally released into urban environments on the popular assumption that they will control the rat population; but there is little scientific basis for this. The reality is that cats find rats to be large and formidable prey, and so they preferentially hunt defenseless wildlife such as lizards and songbirds instead. Scientists and conservationists oppose the use of cats as a form of rodent control because they are so inefficient at destroying pest species that the harm they do to native species in the process outweighs any benefit.

Despite this, cat rescue groups sometimes release unadoptable feral cats into rat-infested neighborhoods under the pretext of giving the cats "jobs" as rat control, as is being done in Chicago and Brooklyn; the cats will largely ignore the rats and instead will beg for food from people or eat garbage and whatever small wildlife they can catch.  Jamie Childs, a public health researcher who has studied urban feral cats, told The Atlantic that he sees cats and rats peaceably eating from the same pile of garbage at the same time.

Ecology of fear 
Ecology of fear or "fear effect": is a negative impact on prey that leads to a decrease in their population due to predators' presence or scent. The study "Urban bird declines and the fear of cats" refers to how native species are reproducing less to avoid predators, even if predator mortality is low. This study indicates how small predator mortality is, which is less than 1%, but it has a considerable impact on the birds' fecundity and reduces the abundance of birds to 95%. The fear effect is one indirect way cats affect native species besides diseases. The presence of cats altered the prey foraging, movement, and stress response and significantly impacted survival and reproduction.

Cat attack outcomes
Wildlife that are attacked by cats fare poorly, even when provided with veterinary treatment by licensed wildlife rehabilitators (over 70% of mammals and over 80% of birds died in spite of treatment in one study). Even those that had no visible injuries from the cat attack often died (55.8% of birds, 33.9% of mammals). Typical wildlife injuries caused by cats include cuts, degloving (the stripping off of skin), and small puncture wounds caused by prey being gripped by the cat's teeth that are easily hidden by fur or feathers. Systemic infection, usually caused by Pasteurella multocida, a highly pathogenic bacterial species that's found naturally in cat mouths, can kill small animals in as little as 15 hours. Few other causes of injury that are commonly seen by wildlife care facilities lead to death as rapidly or as frequently as interaction with a cat.

Cat owner attitudes
According to a study published by People and Nature in 2018, predation by pet cats is an environmental issue that cannot be resolved until cat owners accept that the problem exists and individually take responsibility for addressing it. Surveys of cat owners find they often view the depredation of wildlife as a normal thing that cats do, and rarely feel an individual obligation to prevent it. They may experience some level of cognitive dissonance toward the subject, because when surveyed they're more likely than the general public to believe that cat predation isn't harmful to wildlife, despite the likelihood they have witnessed acts of predation firsthand, and in many cases have been receiving "gifts" of animal carcasses from their cats. Those that express concern also often express a belief that, despite owning the animal, they have no control over what it does, or believe that they can't manage its behavior without compromising the cat's welfare in some way. A few cat owners even take pride in the animals their cats return home, believing it represents the cat's authenticity or skill.

Human interaction 

The relationship between cats and humans began as a commensal relationship due to their predation on rodents, dating back to 7500 BC.in connection to the inception of commensal rodents near Neolithic sedentary communities. There is some debate regarding exactly how early domestication began, but there is enough evidence (DNA and Art) to conclude that humans started domesticating cats in Ancient Egypt. Ancient Egyptians found cats to be beneficial for pest reduction. Human influence on cat evolution can be seen morphologically after the domestication of the cat and the increase of global trade routes, as cats were recruited for rodent control.

Unlike other wild predators, cats are given different forms of aid from humans such as food, shelter, and medical treatment. Aid given by humans present cats with a survival advantage which would not be seen otherwise in the wild, leading to high populations As opportunistic hunters, cats are extremely adaptive to their environments, even if they are a house cat living in a home.

Disease Carriers 
A secondary effect of cat predation on wildlife is the ability to transmit a range of diseases to animals. Cats can spread diseases to animals they interact with and to marine animals. This includes transmission of diseases to humans. In recent years tick populations have increased in size and geographic distribution due to climate change, habitat fragmentation, and host availability. In North America, cats are common tick hosts. Diseases capable of being transmitted through ticks include Theileria Orientalis, and R. rickettsii, hemorrhagic fever. Some of the diseases that can be transmitted from cats to humans include Toxoplasmosis, Hookworms (Uncinaria stenocephala, Ancyclostoma tubaeforme, A. brazilense and A. ceylanicum), Cat-scratch disease (bartonellosis), Rickettsia disease (Rickettesia typhi), Tularemia (Francisella tularensis), and Plague (Yersinia pestis).

Toxoplasmosis 

Toxoplasmosis is caused by the single-celled parasite Toxoplasma gondii, which usually occurs in warm-blooded animals. Still, cats usually are the carriers, which is very dangerous for many birds in Hawaii. Species toxoplasmosis has been found to be fatal are: The Hawaiian crow, The Nene (bird), The Red-footed booby, and the Hawaiian monk seal, many of which are endangered . Toxoplasmosis found in marine Life is attributed to freshwater runoff from cities. Toxoplasmosis can be transmitted from cats to marine organisms, in some instances it is fatal to Hawaiian marine animals. Toxoplasmosis transmitted from cats have been reported in mammalian, avian, marine, marsupial, sheep, and goat species.

Feral cat population management 

Various methods of population control are used to reduce the number of feral cats in areas where they are too abundant, thereby reducing the adverse effects that they often have on wildlife in those areas. Some of the methods most used, particularly in urban areas, are “Trap-Neuter-Return” (TNR) and “Trap-Euthanize” programs, as well as neutering kittens and allowing them to be adopted. Scientific research has not found TNR to be an effective means of controlling the feral cat population. Literature reviews have found that when studies documented TNR colonies that declined in population, those declines were being driven primarily by substantial percentages of colony cats being permanently removed by a combination of rehoming and euthanasia on an ongoing basis, as well as by an unusually high rate of death and disappearance. TNR colonies often increase in population because cats breed quickly and the trapping and sterilization rates are frequently too low to stop this population growth, because food is usually being provided to the cats, and because public awareness of a TNR colony tends to encourage people in the surrounding community to dump their own unwanted pet cats there. The growing popularity of TNR, even near areas of particular ecological sensitivity, has been attributed in part to a lack of public interest regarding the environmental harm caused by feral cats, and the unwillingness of both scientific communities and TNR advocates to engage.

Because hunting behavior in cats is driven by instinct and not by hunger, feeding cats (as in TNR colonies) does nothing to stop them from hunting, even if the cats are overfed. Feeding cats can allow a state of hyperpredation to come about, where human intervention causes an unnaturally high predator population density to continue indefinitely, even if the local prey populations collapse.

Housecats are common in western societies which has an effect on how society views the moral implication of feral cat population management. A study was done in rural and urban England, to determine the perspective of cat owners on managing cat predation of local wildlife. The majority of cat owners agreed that cats should not remain inside to prevent them from hunting. Many cat owners were more concerned about an individuals cats safety then their predation on other animals.

Cat-exclusion zones (CEZ) have been proposed in conservation areas where certain species are vulnerable to predation by cats. These zones are intended for Rural–urban fringe areas serving as a buffer zone to mitigate cat predation from urban cats in rural areas. Cat-exclusion zones were presented in response to the lack of success from existing forms of population management.  There is probable controversy associated with this policy as it can be perceived as restricting one's freedom, due to the relationship between humans and cats.

See also 
 Surplus killing, biology

References

Further reading
.

 Should New Zealand cats be kept indoors?, By Stephen Dowling, 20th February 2023, BBC website. 
 The Flightless Wren and the Lighthouse Cat, Written By Søren Bay Kruse Thomsen, November 13, 2022, 

Animal welfare
Cats
Invasive mammal species
Predation